Malta participated in the 1980 Summer Paralympics in Arnhem, thus returning to the Games after being absent (for the first time) in 1976. The country sent seven representatives (four men and three women) to compete in athletics and lawn bowls.

C. Camilleri and L. Sammut, in the women's pairs in lawn bowls, won Malta's first Paralympic medal since 1964 - a bronze. It is also Malta's most recent Paralympic medal to date (2016).

Medallists

See also
Malta at the 1980 Summer Olympics

References

Nations at the 1980 Summer Paralympics
1980
Paralympics